Gustaf Stanislaus von Engeström, Polish: Gustaw Stanisław Benzelstierna Engeström, Russian: Станислав Лаврентьевич Энгестрём,  (28 July 1791 – 14 October 1850) was a Swedish-Polish count and general in the Russian Army.

He was the son of the Swedish diplomat and statesmen Lars von Engeström and his wife Rosalie Drya-Chiapowska. He started his military career as a Cornet in the Life Guards of Horse regiment in 1808. The very next year he was named a Lieutenant in the same regiment. In 1810 he was named Chamberlain at court of Charles XIII. In 1812 he became a Rittmeister and later the same year a Staff officer.

Stanislaus took part in the Battle of Leipzig in 1813 as an adjutant to Field Marshal Gebhard von Blücher, and was subsequently awarded with the prussian Pour le Mérite for his actions during the battle. He was also awarded the Swedish Order of the Sword and the För tapperhet i fält medal for it.

In 1814 he became a Major in the Smålands Regiment. He became a brigadier at the Swedish generalstaff in 1816. He was dismissed from his post in 1817 and soon entered into prussian and later Russian service. He died in 1850 having achieved the rank of Major general in the Russian army.

Galleri

Awards 

   Knight of the Order of the Sword,
   Medal in gold for För tapperhet i fält,
   Knight of the Pour le Mérite,
   Knight 4th Class of the Order of St. George,
   Knight of the Order of the White Eagle,
   Knight Commander of the Order of St. Stanislaus,

References 

1791 births
1850 deaths
Recipients of the Pour le Mérite (military class)